Victoria Smurfit (born 31 March 1974) is an Irish actress. She is known for playing Orla O'Connell in the BBC television series Ballykissangel, Detective Chief Inspector Roisin Connor in the ITV police procedural Trial & Retribution and Cruella de Vil in Once Upon a Time for which she was nominated as Best Supporting Actress in 13th IFTA Film & Drama Awards in 2016.

Early life
Victoria Smurfit is part of the Smurfit family which, through Smurfit Kappa, is one of the richest in Ireland. The family, headed by Victoria's uncle Michael Smurfit, sponsors a number of sporting events including the Smurfit European Open and the Champion Hurdle. The family is also associated with Smurfit Business School in University College Dublin (UCD). Smurfit studied for an A-level in theatre studies and subsequently went onto the Bristol Old Vic Theatre School.

Career
Smurfit gained fame for her role as Orla O'Connell in the BBC television series Ballykissangel from 1998 to 1999. She played Nina in the 2003 film Bulletproof Monk. From 2003 to 2009, Smurfit portrayed the lead role of Detective Chief Inspector Roisin Connor in the ITV police procedural Trial & Retribution. She also guest starred in the BBC Radio 4 series Baldi. In 2011 Smurfit appeared in the Agatha Christie's Marple television episode "The Mirror Crack'd from Side to Side".

In 2013, Smurfit co-starred as Lady Jayne Wetherby in the NBC television period drama Dracula. In 2014, she began playing the recurring guest role of Cruella de Vil in ABC's Once Upon a Time.

In the run-up to shooting for her role in Homecoming, she described the film as a "mean girls for grown-ups". She played Nikki, the "head mean girl". In 2021 she played Pippa in Deadly Cuts and in 2022 played Olivia Foyle in "Bloodlands".

Personal life
Smurfit married advertising executive Douglas Baxter on 29 July 2000 in Surrey, England and gave birth to their first child, daughter Evie Dorothy Baxter in Dublin, Ireland on 2 November 2004. A second daughter, Ridley Belle Baxter was born in May 2007. Their third child, a boy, was born in November 2008 and named Flynn Alexander Baxter. In 2012 the family relocated to Santa Monica, California, US. In February 2015 it was announced that Smurfit and her husband had filed for divorce.

She wrote an opinion blog for The Dubliner, which often featured anecdotes from her personal life, and is a patron of the children's charity World Vision Ireland.

Filmography

Awards & nominations

References

External links
 

1974 births
Living people
Irish film actresses
Irish television actresses
People educated at St Columba's College, Dublin
People from County Dublin
People educated at St. George's School, Ascot
Irish expatriates in the United States